James Findlay may refer to:

Politicians
 James Findlay (MP) (1833–1923), Canadian Member of Parliament
 James Findlay (Vancouver mayor) (1854–1924), Canadian politician 
 James Findlay (Cincinnati mayor) (1770–1835), mayor of Cincinnati; member of United States Congress

Others
 James Findlay (swimmer) (1954–2015), Australian Olympic swimmer
 James Leslie Findlay (1868–1952), Scottish soldier and architect
 James Lloyd Findlay (1895–1983), Royal New Zealand Air Force officer

See also
 James Finlay, Scottish rugby player
 James Finlay Bangladesh, a shipping and tea business
 James Finley (disambiguation)
 James Finlayson (disambiguation)